Krasnaya Bashkiriya (Qıźıl Başqortostan) is a rural locality (a selo) and the administrative center of Krasnobashkirsky Selsoviet, Abzelilovsky District, Bashkortostan, Russia. The population was 2,435 as of 2010. There are 36 streets.

Geography 
Krasnaya Bashkiriya is located 29 km northeast of Askarovo (the district's administrative centre) by road. Magnitogorsk is the nearest rural locality.

References 

Rural localities in Abzelilovsky District